The 2015–16 Saint Joseph's Hawks basketball team represented Saint Joseph's University during the 2015–16 NCAA Division I men's basketball season. The Hawks, led by 21st year head coach Phil Martelli, played their home games at Hagan Arena and are members of the Atlantic 10 Conference. The Hawks finished the season 28–8, 13–5 in A-10 play to finish in fourth place. They defeated George Washington, Dayton, and VCU to be champions of the A-10 tournament and earn the conference's automatic bid to the NCAA tournament. As a #8 seed, they defeated Cincinnati in the first round, their first NCAA Tournament victory since 2004, to advance to the second round where they lost to Oregon. DeAndre' Bembry was named A-10 player of the year.

Previous season
The Hawks finished the 2014–15 season 13–18, 7–11 in A-10 play to finish in tenth place. They lost in the second round of the A-10 tournament to St. Bonaventure.

Departures

Incoming recruits

Recruits Class of 2016

Roster

Schedule

|-
!colspan=9 style=| Regular season

|-
!colspan=9 style=| Atlantic 10 tournament

|-
!colspan=9 style=| NCAA tournament

Rankings

*AP does not release post-NCAA tournament rankings

References

Saint Joseph's Hawks men's basketball seasons
Saint Joseph's
Saint Joseph's